Lyubov Ibragimova née: Alekseyeva (born 5 May 1984) is a Kazakhstani ice hockey player. She competed in the women's tournament at the 2002 Winter Olympics.

References

External links
 

1984 births
Living people
Kazakhstani women's ice hockey forwards
Olympic ice hockey players of Kazakhstan
Ice hockey players at the 2002 Winter Olympics
Asian Games gold medalists for Kazakhstan
Medalists at the 2003 Asian Winter Games
Medalists at the 2007 Asian Winter Games
Medalists at the 2011 Asian Winter Games
Asian Games medalists in ice hockey
Sportspeople from Almaty
Ice hockey players at the 2003 Asian Winter Games
Ice hockey players at the 2007 Asian Winter Games
Ice hockey players at the 2011 Asian Winter Games